Alternative Distribution Alliance (ADA) is a music distribution company owned by Warner Music Group, which represents the rights to various independent record labels. ADA provides "independent artist and label partners with access to the resources, relationships and experience required to share their creative vision with a global audience."

As the independent music distribution arm of Warner Music Group, ADA Worldwide was created in 1993 as a joint-venture between WMG and Restless Records to offer a distribution system and marketing, merchandising, promotion, and music licensing services.

In 2012, Warner Music Group combined Independent Label Group with ADA to create a full-service company that provides services including physical and digital global distribution, physical production, merchandise production and distribution. ADA offers account management, an in-house music licensing function, custom products and services, marketing and sponsorships, as well as digital marketing tools.

In March 2017, ADA announced that it would distribute the catalogs of most of the labels owned by BMG Rights Management worldwide.

In January 2020, Beggars Group, Domino Recording Co., and Saddle Creek left ADA and switched to Redeye Distribution, and later in November, Entertainment One followed suit and had AMPED distribute most of eOne's labels.

Independent labels

3CG Records
7-10 Music
Acony Records
Adrenaline Music
Africori Music Group
Air
Alligator Records
Alma Records
Altitude Records
Anzic Records
Artist First
Arhoolie Records
Avitone Records
Bad Apple
Bad Timing Records
Bar/None Records
Barrowman/Barker Productions (UK)
Beauty Marks Entertainment 
Bieler Bros. Records
Blind Man Sound
Blind Pig Records
Bloodshot Records
Blix Street Records
Blisslife Records
Blistering Records
Blue Corn Music
Blue Horizon
BMG Rights Management
Bolero Records
Born & Bred Records
Bridge 9 Records
Brash Records
Brassland
Breakbeat Science Records
Bright Antenna
Broken Bow Records
Bronze Records
Canyon Records
Carpark Records
Castle Music
Cavity Search Records
CDBaby (top sellers from the online store)
Cherrytree Records
Chesky Records
Chime Entertainment
Chrysalis Records (certain artists' reissues only; since 2017)
CMC International
Comedy Central Records
Compass Records
Courgette Records
Crunchy Frog Records
Curb Records
Daft Life
David Lynch Music Company
DaySpring Records
Deko Entertainment
Dogtree Records
Downtown Records (select releases)
Dcide Records
Decaydance Records
Dim Mak Records
DimeRock Records
Discotek Media
Dualtone Records
Echo Records
el Music Group
Enigma Records (only select titles absorbed into Restless Records)
Everfine Records
Eyeball Records
Ferret Music
Funzalo Records
Gauche Records
Good Fight
GWR Records
Half Note Records
Herb Alpert Presents
High Note Records
Hellcat Records
I and Ear Records
Imagen Records
Inside Recordings
InVogue Records
I Scream Records
JEMP Records
LAB Records
Lakeshore Records (physical)
Lex Records
Macklemore LLC
Marshall Records
Masquerade Recordings
Mayhem Records
Manifesto Records
Misfits Records
Metropolis Records
Minty Fresh Records
Music Branding
Mute Records
Myrrh Records
Napalm Records
Nervous Records
Nettwerk
New High Recordings
Nitro Records
Nixa Records
Northern Flame Music (NFM)
Nuclear Blast
Nudgie Records
Onyxx Records
Omnivore Recordings
Partisan Records
Producer Entertainment Group
Play Tyme Records
PRT Records
Pure Noise Records
Polyvinyl Record Company
Popsicle Records
Projekt Records
Psychopathic Records
Punahele Records
Pye Records
Restless Records
Rhymesayers Entertainment
Rise Records
Rock Ridge Music
RT Industries
Run For Cover Records
Sanctuary Records
Select Records
StandBy Records
SideOneDummy Records
Skeleton Crew
Slugfest Records
Small Stone Records
Stony Plain Records
Strictly Rhythm Records
Sub Pop Records
Sumerian Records
Surfdog Records
Take This To Heart Records
Tender Loving Empire
Tommy Boy Entertainment
Thirsty Ear Recordings
TML Entertainment
Troubleman Unlimited
The Control Group
The Throwdowns
Thrill Jockey Records
Tomorrow Records
Tortur3 Entertainment
Touch & Go Records
Ubiquity Records
Unidisc Music
Upstream Records
V2 Records
We Put Out Records
Wichita Records (select releases)
Williams Street Records
WaterTower Music
Word Records
Warcon Enterprises
You Entertainment

References

Record labels established in 1993
1993 establishments in the United States
Warner Music labels
Labels distributed by Warner Music Group
American record labels
Record label distributors
Cavity Search Records